Island of Lost Ships is a 1987 Soviet two-part musical television miniseries directed by Evgeniy Ginzburg and Rauf Mamedov and based on the eponymous novel by Alexander Belyaev.

Plot
The film begins as an ordinary modern man, resident of Leningrad named Volodya (Gediminas Storpirshtis), quarrels with his wife. Then he goes outside ... and unexpectedly finds himself in 1928 Marseilles, in the body of murderer (according to the inspector who arrested him Jimmy Simpkins) Reginald Gatling.

Together they board a steamer which should take them to America, "closer to the electric chair". But at night the ship crashes and drowns for unknown reasons. Miraculously surviving Volodya, Jimmy, as well as charming passenger Vivian Kingman (Larissa Belogurova) - a carbon copy of Volodya's wife - board the Flying Dutchman which swam to the place of the disaster and continues to drift on the high seas. And then they get to an island formed from the wreckage of half-sunk ships, lost in the Sargasso Sea. The ruler of the island is Fergus Slayton (Arunas Storpirstis), his closest assistant is Sholom-Trepach (Konstantin Raikin). In addition to them, the island is inhabited by: Trepach's wife Maggie (Natalia Lapina), the historian Luders with his wife Frida (Lilian Malkina) and many more sailors, travelers, pirates. According to custom, newcomer Vivian should choose her husband from one of the island's inhabitants. Slayton, who himself became fond of her, locks Volodya and Jimmy in the cooler, but they manage to free themselves and catch the ceremony of choosing the groom. Vivian chooses Volodya to be her husband because she is in love with him. Islanders arrange a magnificent wedding. Then comes the wedding night and Volodya confesses to Vivian that he is already married and has "came from another world." But now he does not care, he's in love with Vivian ... Meanwhile, Jimmy is watching Slayton. He notices the "tail" and is worried.

And the next morning, Jimmy accidentally wanders into the hold of some abandoned ship, where he discovers Slyton Edward's brother, locked in a cage. He's clearly not himself. At this time, Slayton approaches. He tells Jimmy about his brother, and also about his relationship with Maggie. This conversation is heard by Trepach. He is shocked by the fact that his wife cheated on him. Meanwhile, Slayton leads Jimmy out, but Volodya appears. He frees Edward, but he ends up running about the island in a frenzy and dies. Meanwhile, Slayton shares with Jimmy his plans for the island: he wants to fly in a balloon, and then go back for the treasure. After that, Slayton pushes Jimmy into the water and shoots him in front of the island's inhabitants. Trepach announces over the loudspeaker everything he heard in the conversation between Jimmy and Slayton, and immediately gets a bullet into his forehead. Then Slayton kills Vivian out of revenge and escapes. He is chased after but manages to fly away in a hot air balloon.

But Volodya suddenly finds himself again in his own age. Judging by his ragged appearance, unshaven face and a bump on the back of his head, everything that happened to him was not just a dream. It all ends with Volodya returning to his apartment and sitting down to dinner with his wife, who strongly resembles the deceased Vivian.

Cast
Larissa Belogurova - Vivian Kingman / Volodya's wife / Della Jackson
Gediminas Storpirshtis - Volodya / Reginald Gatling
Nikolai Lavrov - Special agent Jim Simpkins
Konstantin Raikin - Sholom-Trepach
Natalia Lapina - Maggie
Arunas Storpirshtis - Governor Fergus Slayton (voiced by Andrei Tolubeyev)
Lillian Malkina - Frida
Gali Abaydulov
Valentin Zhilyaev - Red
Sergey Parshin - "The Sailor"
Semyon Furman - "Asian"
Arkady Shalolashvili - "The Turk"
Mikhail Shtein - "Lilliput"
Mikhail Scheglov - Lyuders, husband of Frida
Tito Romalio - "Mulatto"
Algis Arlauskas
Larisa Dolina
Yuri Senkevich - cameo

Soundtrack
"The Legendary Song" (music by Vladimir Davydenko, words by Yuri Ryashentsev) performed by Vladimir Stephin, Ella Fidelman, Nina Matveeva.
"The path to the bottom" (music by Georgy Garanian, words by Yuri Ryashentsev) are performed by Lyubov Privil, Vladimir Stepan, Ella Fidelman, Nina Matveeva.
"Shark" (music by Aleksandr Zatsepin, words by Yuri Ryashentsev) performed by Nikolai Noskov.
"Oh, if not love ..." (music by Vladimir Davydenko, words by Yuri Ryashentsev) performed by Nikolai Noskov and Ella Fidelman.
"Ghosts" (music by Georgy Garanian, words by Yuri Ryashentsev) performed by Vladimir Presnyakov Jr.
"The Song of the Sholom Meeting Newcomers" (music by Aleksandre Basilaia, words by Yuri Ryashentsev) performed by Mikhail Pokhmanov.
"The Song of Bermuda" (music by Yury Saulsky, words by Yuri Ryashentsev) performed by Vladimir Stoopin.
"On the Island" (music David Tukhmanov, words by Yuri Ryashentsev) performed by Sergey Minaev.
"Wedding Song" (music by David Tukhmanov, words by Yuri Ryashentsev) performed by Sergey Minaev.
"Draw lots" (words by Yuri Ryashentsev) performed by Mikhail Pokhmanov.
"The beginning of each of us" (music by Yury Saulsky, words by Yuri Ryashentsev) performed by Sergey Minaev.
"Letters to the Beloved" (music by Aleksandre Basilaia, words by Yuri Ryashentsev) performed by the band Iveria.
"My Faithful Moor" (Vladimir Davydenko, words by Yuri Ryashentsev) performed by Larisa Dolina.
"Song of a legal marriage" (music by Aleksandre Basilaia, words by Yuri Ryashentsev) performed by Sergey Minaev.
"Nothing to possess" (music by Aleksandr Zatsepin, words by Yuri Ryashentsev) performed by the ensemble Iveria.
"Governor of Slighton number" (Vladimir Davydenko's music, words by Yuri Ryashentsev) performed by Pavel Smeyan.
"The song of Sholom about his wife" (Vladimir Davydenko's music, words by Yuri Ryashentsev) performed by Mikhail Pokhmanov.
"Romance" (music by Vladimir Davydenko, words by Yuri Ryashentsev) performed by Nikolai Noskov.

References

External links

Russian musical films
Soviet musical films
Soviet television miniseries
1980s television miniseries
1980s Soviet television series
Films based on Russian novels
Films scored by Aleksandr Zatsepin
Films set in 1928
Russian science fiction films